Jimmy King is a basketball player.

Jimmy King may also refer to:
Jimmy King (Emmerdale), fictional character
Jimmy King (Revolution), alias of fictional character, President Sebastian Monroe

See also
James King (disambiguation)